John Gordon Morrison (July 13, 1838 – June 9, 1897) served in the American Civil War, receiving the Medal of Honor in 1862.

Biography
Morrison was born in Ireland and came to the United States in 1855. Enlisting in the 30th New York Infantry at Lansingburgh, New York, April 24, 1861, he volunteered for service on gunboat  on February 15, 1862. He was appointed coxswain and later received the Medal of Honor for exceptional bravery during an engagement on  July 15, 1862, with Confederate ram  in the Yazoo River. He was an inspiring example to the crew during Carondelets unsuccessful attempt to halt the ironclad ram's progress through the Union blockade to the Mississippi River.
.
Coxswain Morrison was discharged from the Navy March 31, 1863. In September 1864, he enlisted at Troy, New York in the 21st New York Cavalry Regiment, mustered in as a private, and mustered out in May 1865 at Bladensburg, Maryland.

Medal of Honor citationRank and Organization:Rank and organization: Coxswain, U.S. Navy. Entered service at: Lansingburg, N.Y. Born: November 3, 1842, Ireland G.O. No.: 59, June 22, 1865.Citation:'
Serving as coxswain on board the USS Carondelet, Morrison was commended for meritorious conduct in general and especially for his heroic conduct and his inspiring example to the crew in the engagement with the rebel ram Arkansas, Yazoo River, 15 July 1862. When the Carondelet was badly cut up, several of her crew killed, many wounded and others almost suffocated from the effects of escaped steam, Morrison was the leader when boarders were called on deck, and the first to return to the guns and give the ram a broadside as she passed. His presence of mind in time of battle or trial is reported as always conspicuous and encouraging.

Later life
Morrison died in New York City June 9, 1897.

He is buried in Cypress Hills Cemetery, Brooklyn, New York. His grave can be found in section 9, lot 359.

Namesake
In 1943, the destroyer  was named in his honor.

See also

 List of Medal of Honor recipients
 List of American Civil War Medal of Honor recipients: M–P

Notes

References

:
 
 
 
 
 

Irish-born Medal of Honor recipients
1838 births
1897 deaths
19th-century Irish people
Irish sailors in the United States Navy
Union Navy sailors
United States Navy Medal of Honor recipients
United States Navy sailors
Irish emigrants to the United States (before 1923)
People of New York (state) in the American Civil War
American Civil War recipients of the Medal of Honor
American people in whaling
Australian people in whaling